The S class are a class of diesel locomotives built by Clyde Engineering, Forrestfield for Westrail in 1998.

History
The S class were the first and only dual-cab locomotives purchased by Westrail. In May 1996 nine were ordered from Clyde Engineering as part of an order that also included 15  Q class locomotives. The order later extended to eleven. They are an evolution of the FreightCorp 82 class. All were assembled at a facility established by Clyde Engineering within Westrail's Forrestfield Depot to fulfill the contract. The frames were built at Clyde's Somerton plant with other components manufactured at Kelso.

The S class locomotives entered service in June 1998 hauling ore and mineral trains in South West Western Australia. All were in service by November 1998

All were included in the sale of Westrail to Australian Railroad Group in December 2000, with the class redesignated as the 3300 class. In June 2006, all were included in the sale of Australian Railroad Group's Western Australian operation to QR National.

In 2008, Rio Tinto ordered two standard gauge JT42Cs of the same design as the S class for the Weipa bauxite railway, numbered R1005 and R1006. They were delivered in 2009.

References

Aurizon diesel locomotives
Clyde Engineering locomotives
Co-Co locomotives
Diesel locomotives of Western Australia
Railway locomotives introduced in 1998
Diesel-electric locomotives of Australia
3 ft 6 in gauge locomotives of Australia